Seedy Bah (born July 6, 1992) is a Gambian footballer.

Career

Professional
Bah was born in Bakau, and came to the United States in 2010 as part of an exchange programme with the club side Colorado Rush, who run a Rush Academy in the Gambian capital, Banjul. After trialing with Seattle Sounders FC of Major League Soccer during the spring of 2011, Bah signed with Charleston Battery in the USL Professional Division on March 23, 2011.

He made his professional debut on April 9, 2011 in a game against the Charlotte Eagles.

International
Bah has represented Gambia at U-17 level, and has also spent time with the US Development academy.

References

External links
Charleston Battery bio

1992 births
Living people
Gambian footballers
The Gambia youth international footballers
Gambian expatriate footballers
Charleston Battery players
USL Championship players
Expatriate soccer players in the United States
Gambian expatriate sportspeople in the United States
Bakau United FC players
People from Bakau
Association football forwards